Good Bait is an album by vibraphonist Bobby Hutcherson featuring performances recorded in 1984 and released the following year as the first recording on Orrin Keepnews's Landmark label.

Reception

On AllMusic, Scott Yanow observed "Hutcherson performs a strong set of solid advanced hard bop".

Track listing
All compositions by Bobby Hutcherson except where noted.
 "Love Samba" (McCoy Tyner) – 7:19
 "Good Bait" (Tadd Dameron) – 6:09
 "Highway One" – 7:18
 "In Walked Bud" (Thelonious Monk) – 5:27
 "Montgomery" – 4:38
 "Spring Is Here" (Richard Rodgers, Lorenz Hart) – 5:18
 "Israel" (John Carisi) – 4:41

Personnel
Bobby Hutcherson – vibraphone
Branford Marsalis – soprano saxophone, tenor saxophone (tracks 1–5 & 7)
George Cables – piano
Ray Drummond – bass
Philly Joe Jones – drums

References

Landmark Records albums
Bobby Hutcherson albums
1985 albums
Albums produced by Orrin Keepnews